Brian Safo Oddei (born 18 September 2002) is a Ghanaian-Italian professional footballer who plays as a right winger for Serie A club Sassuolo.

Club career
Oddei was raised in the youth teams of Sassuolo. He was first called up to the senior squad in December 2019 for Serie A and Coppa Italia games, but remained on the bench on that occasion. He was moved from the Under-19 squad to the senior squad on a permanent basis in November 2020.

He made his Serie A debut for Sassuolo on 10 January 2021 in a 3–1 away loss against Juventus. He substituted Mert Müldür in the 73rd minute.

On 31 August 2021, Oddei joined Serie B club Crotone on loan. On 31 January 2022, the loan was terminated early and he returned to Sassuolo.

Personal life 
Born in Accra, he went to Italy when he was 11 years old.

References

External links
 
 

2002 births
Living people
Footballers from Accra
Italian footballers
Italian sportspeople of African descent
Ghanaian emigrants to Italy
Naturalised citizens of Italy
Association football forwards
U.S. Sassuolo Calcio players
F.C. Crotone players
Serie A players
Serie B players